The TeST TST-13 Junior is a single-seat touring motor glider with a nose-mounted engine, built by TeST in Czech Republic.  It is an all composite design which succeeded the TeST TST-9 Junior motor glider in production, incorporating some features of the TeST TST-10 Atlas sailplane, including its wing.

Development and design
TeST introduced the TST-13 single seat motor glider in 2005 as an all-composite replacement for their wood and composite TST-9.  It has a similar layout, front engined and with a high T-tail.  The TST-13 shares  a similar rear fuselage and tail design and identical wing spars with the all-composite TST-10 single seat sailplane. It is a mid wing design with straight tapered wings which, unlike those of the TST-10, are swept forward 5° at 25% chord.  The wing tips carry winglets and there are outboard ailerons, two position flaps and upper surface spoilers.

The fuselage of the TST-13 is built from two half shells which incorporate the straight tapered fin.  The fuselage tapers rearwards, producing an arched shape below.  The tailplane carries a single piece elevator.  The light aircraft style cockpit has a rear hinged, single piece canopy and is placed ahead of the wing leading edge.  The TST-13 has a tailwheel undercarriage, with spatted mainwheels on fuselage-mounted, sprung, cantilever legs.

There is a choice of two engines: either a 31 kW (42 hp) Rotax 447 or a 37 kW (50 hp) Rotax 503.  The 447 drives a propeller which is only adjustable in pitch on the ground, but that of the 503, geared down 2:1, can be feathered in flight. Feathering improves the best glide ratio from 1:24 to 1:32.  The greater power of the Rotax 503 increases the cruising speed by about 10 km/h and the climb rate to about 6 m/s (1,200 ft/min).

Operational history
5 TST-13s had been built by 2007. In mid-2010 2 appeared on civil aircraft registers of European countries west of Russia.  The TST-13 is designed to meet the US LSA glider constraints and is S-LSA registerable.

Specifications (Rotax 447 engine)

See also

References

External links

TST-13
Motor gliders
2000s Czech sailplanes
Single-engined tractor aircraft
Mid-wing aircraft
T-tail aircraft